The 1996 Vienna Cup took place in October 1996. Skaters competed in the disciplines of men's singles, ladies' singles, and ice dancing.

Results

Men

Ladies

References

Karl Schäfer Memorial
Karl Schafer Memorial, 1996
Karl Schafer Memorial